The South Fork Eel River is the largest tributary of the Eel River in north-central California in the United States. The South Fork drains a long and narrow portion of the Coast Range of California in parts of Mendocino and Humboldt counties. U.S. Route 101 follows the river for much of its length.

The Kai Pomo, a branch of the Pomo people, once lived in the upper portion of the watershed. Before industrial development in the 1800s, many native tribes relied on the river's abundant runs of salmon and steelhead. In the 1920s, a private company built the Benbow Dam, blocking fish migration to a large area of the basin.

The South Fork is designated as a National Wild and Scenic River from the confluence of Section Four Creek to the mouth.

Course
Its headwaters are near that of the Ten Mile River to the south. Dropping off the high plateau where it begins, the South Fork winds north and bends southwest through a steep and narrow canyon. It is not long after its headwaters that Branscomb Road drops into the South Fork Eel's canyon from the north, paralleling the river. Almost  past this point, it receives its first significant tributary, Section Four Creek, on the left bank. The river meanders swiftly west and turns west-northwest, passing Branscomb, California. Near the city, it receives Rock Creek on the right and Redwood Creek on the left. These two stream names are a common occurrence throughout the South Fork's watershed. Afterwards, it receives its first significant tributary, Tenmile Creek, on the right bank. Tenmile Creek begins in another section of the Coast Range, separated from the South Fork Eel River by two sub-ranges. The creek begins in the easternmost of these two sub-ranges. It then flows west, cutting a water gap through the western subrange, and spills into the South Fork.

After the confluence with Tenmile Creek, the South Fork flows generally north, turning west where it receives another major tributary,  Rattlesnake Creek, also on the right. This point is significant because it is where it begins to parallel U.S. Highway 101 and California State Route 271 (Redwood Highway and Old Redwood Highway). Both roads come in from the east and at this point are on the river's right bank. The river turns northwest, receiving Big Dann Creek and another large  tributary, Cedar Creek, on the right bank. Cedar Creek flows west and turns south-southwest, flowing also in a steep, undeveloped gorge. Shortly past Cedar Creek, the South Fork Eel meets another large tributary, Hollow Tree Creek. Hollow Tree Creek flows east, turns north, then turns east again to meet the South Fork, fed by several smaller creeks. The South Fork then turns west again, flowing through the Standish Hickey State Recreational Area. It then meanders north into Richardson Grove State Park on an increasingly wide valley floor, receiving Red Mountain Creek on the right bank.

The river then reaches Benbow Lake, which is inside the Benbow State Recreation Area and next to the town of Benbow, California. Benbow Lake was a seasonal reservoir, formed by a dam at its western end. The dam was only raised in the summer, and only when water flow is sufficient for impoundment. Since about 2009, the lake no longer gets built, which is good for the ecology of the river. At Benbow Lake the South Fork meets its largest tributary, the East Branch South Fork Eel River. After passing through the Benbow Dam, which is non-functional during the winter months, the South Fork Eel receives another tributary called Redwood Creek on the left bank, as it bends north and then west around the community of Redway, California, which is located on a plateau east of the river. The river then passes through another rugged canyon, flowing northeast, then passes the towns of Phillipsville and Miranda which are to the east of the river. West of Miranda, the river receives another medium-sized tributary, Salmon Creek, from the left bank.

The South Fork then flows north to a point where it turns sharply around a ridge and flows due south, then turns back north again. At this point, it is paralleled by Highway 101 on the left bank and by California State Route 254 (Avenue of the Giants) on the right bank. U.S. 101 then crosses the South Fork, paralleling CA-254. The village of Myers Flat is located on a low slice of terrain north of the river. The South Fork, nearing its mouth, passes Burlington on the right bank, and Weott, California, also on the right bank. Several hundred yards upstream from its confluence, it receives its last major tributary, Bull Creek, on the left bank. Bull Creek, whose watershed is entirely contained inside Humboldt Redwoods State Park, begins south of Grasshopper Mountain and flows northwest, then makes a great bend to the west and joins the South Fork.
and receives its last named tributary, Cabin Creek, on the left bank. Meandering through a downcut channel between U.S. 101 and SR 254 (right bank) and California State Route 211, it then crosses under the former two highways, spreads wider, and flows into the Eel River.

Watershed
The South Fork Eel River drains a long, narrow and mountainous watershed of –or almost 20 percent of the  Eel River drainage basin.

Due to its rugged and remote location, the watershed is thinly populated. Although U.S. Highway 101 and California State Route 271 follow the river for over 70 percent of its length, there are few communities in the steep and narrow, forested canyon of the South Fork. Towns along the river include Branscomb, Underwood Park, Leggett, Piercy, Andersonia, Benbow, Garberville, Redway, Phillipsville, Miranda, Myers Flat, and Weott. The South Fork also has a number of protected areas along its course. These include Admiral Standley State Park, Standish Hickey State Recreation Area, Smithe Redwoods State Reserve, Richardson Grove State Park, South Fork Eel River Wilderness, Benbow State Recreation Area, and Humboldt Redwoods State Park. The river is used for recreation and provides groundwater recharge and industrial, agricultural and municipal water supply for residents.

There are many streams with repeating names in the watershed, including Low Gap Creek, Redwood Creek, Rock Creek, and Red Mountain Creek.

Historic logging activity in the South Fork watershed has stripped steep hillsides bare of vegetation, resulting in chronic erosion problems. Historically, South Fork Eel River water had an unusual translucent blue-green hue for most of the year. Increased turbidity levels caused by erosion has transformed the river into a generally brownish or tannish color. The South Fork is an important Northern California habitat for anadromous fish (see section below) and sediment has severely degraded conditions for these fish as well as other aquatic life forms.

The rugged topography of the South Fork Eel River watershed also produces an amount of waterfalls from tributary streams. Although there are no large waterfalls on the South Fork or its major tributaries, there are many on smaller side streams, especially after heavy rainfall. The steep terrain also causes the river to fall at steep inclines, creating a series of rapids. The river's rapids are well known for rafting.

Discharge
The United States Geological Survey operates or operated four stream gauges on the South Fork, at Miranda, Garberville, Leggett, and Branscomb.
 
For Garberville, a stream gauge was only operated from 1912–1913, and again in 1940.

The Leggett stream gauge began operating in 1965 and is still in use.

Geology
The watershed is underlain by the Franciscan Assemblage, which consists of soft soil and rock in this region. The formation is created by the San Andreas Fault, and comprises most of California's Coast Range. The steep terrain in the South Fork Eel's watershed is the result of continuous uplift along the San Andreas Fault, and coinciding with the erosion caused by the river and its tributaries, steep canyons and ridges, many with slopes of over 50 percent, were formed. Of note is that the downstream reach of the river "may be uplifting as much as ten times faster than the headwaters area". In much of the middle and lower course of the South Fork Eel, the riverbed is mostly bare gravel, with sparse vegetation, and without a floodplain. The riverbed lies in a downcut channel, with its walls formed by bedrock with scattering of rocks. Bedrock river terraces surround the river, forming the "only level land in an otherwise rugged terrain of narrow ridges and steep [v]alleys".

History

Prior to white settlement of Central California, much of the Eel River watershed was inhabited by Pomo Indians and Athapascan peoples. The "extreme headwaters" of the South Fork of the Eel River, as well as the East Fork of the South Fork of the Eel River, were inhabited by the Kai Pomo, whose territory stretched westward to the Eel River mainstem and west and north to the boundary with the Athapascan. The lower section of the South Fork Eel was also said to be a boundary between tribes, although this claim is only "probable".

In 1928, the Benbow Dam was built across the South Fork near Benbow, California, which led to the creation of a slackwater pool, Benbow Lake, and the creation of the Benbow State Recreation Area. During the rainy season, the floodgates of the dam were removed. The lake existed during the summer, when lower flows are impounded behind the structure for recreation. The stagnant water in the lake was heated by the sun to a higher temperature than normal and severely hurt salmon and steelhead runs, as well as other aquatic and migratory life downstream. Since 2009 the dam was no longer erected.  Benbow Dam was finally removed from 2016-2017 on the South Fork of the Eel River.  Dam decommissioning will start to occur on the Klamath River in 2022 pending Federal Energy Regulatory Committee (FERC) approval. 

The  South Fork Eel River Wilderness was designated in 2006, stretching along portions of the South Fork Eel and extending westward to the Pacific Ocean. The wilderness area borders that of the King Range Wilderness, which is said to be the "longest stretch of undeveloped coastline in the United States outside of Alaska".

Natural history
The river provides wildlife habitat for preservation of rare and endangered species including cold freshwater habitat for fish migration and spawning. The South Fork Eel was historically rich in salmon and other species of anadromous fish, and has been known as the "most productive sub-basin for anadromous fish". The main anadromous fishes in the South Fork are chinook salmon, coho salmon and steelhead, and it is said that "the South Fork Eel River once supported about half of the total coho run for the State of California". Historically, the population of chinook was 20,000 while coho averaged 16,000 at Benbow Dam in the 1930s. Since then, the population has steadily declined, with a current population of roughly 1,000. The reason for the decline is the high amount of silt carried into the river by logging activity and road construction. The silt has filled stream pools and caused higher turbidity, which has harmed fish. The South Fork is said to be the last habitat in the State of California for wild coho.

Several tributaries, such as Hollow Tree Creek, also support anadromous fish, but they have become impaired in ways similar to the South Fork Eel.

List of tributaries

Cabin Creek
Bull Creek
Tepee Creek
Cow Creek
Cornick Creek
Calf Creek
Miller Creek
Harper Creek
Squaw Creek
Albee Creek
Mill Creek
Cuneo Creek
North Fork Cuneo Creek
Burns Creek
Panther Creek
Decker Creek
Corner Creek
Mill Creek
Robinson Creek
Feese Creek
Canoe Creek
North Fork Canoe Creek
Mowry Creek
Coon Creek
Kerr Creek
Bridge Creek
Elk Creek
Dry Creek
Salmon Creek
Mill Creek
South Fork Salmon Creek
Bogus Creek
Kinsey Creek
Tostin Creek
Hacker Creek
Butte Creek
Coon Creek
Fish Creek
Anderson Creek
Olvnan Creek
Rocky Glen Creek
Hooker Creek
William Creek
Tuttle Creek
Dean Creek
Leggett Creek
Redwood Creek
Seely Creek
Somerville Creek
Miller Creek
China Creek
Dinner Creek
Bluff Creek
Bear Canyon Creek
South Fork Bear Canyon Creek
Connick Creek
Sproul Creek
West Fork Sproul Creek
Little Sproul Creek
Sawmill Creek
East Branch South Fork Eel River
Buck Mountain Creek
Squaw Creek
West Branch Squaw Creek
Rancheria Creek
Rays Creek
Tom Long Creek
North Fork Tom Long Creek
Cruso Cabin Creek
Elkhorn Creek
Fish Creek
Durphy Creek
Hartsook Creek
Milk Ranch Creek
Low Gap Creek
Indian Creek
Jones Creek
Parker Creek
Piercy Creek
Standley Creek
McCoy Creek
Bear Pen Creek
Cub Creek
Red Mountain Creek
Holohan Gulch
Mud Creek
Wildcat Creek
Bridges Creek
Dora Creek
Mill Creek
Rock Creek
Hollow Tree Creek
South Fork Hollow Tree Creek
Mule Creek
Middle Creek
Lost Man Creek
Lost Pipe Creek
Walters Creek
Bear Creek
Redwood Creek
Bond Creek
Michaels Creek
Doctors Creek
Lynch Creek
Waldron Creek
Bear Pen Creek
Huckleberry Creek
Bear Wallow Creek
Little Bear Wallow Creek
Lynch Gap
Butler Creek
Right Fork Butler Creek
Mitchell Creek
Cedar Creek
Little Cedar Creek
"Blue Rock Creek"
Big Dann Creek
Little Dann Creek
Grizzly Creek
Low Gap Creek
Little Low Gap Creek
Rattlesnake Creek
Squaw Creek
Measly Creek
Wilson Creek
Foster Creek
Elk Creek
Cummings Creek
Twin Rocks Creek
Grapevine Creek
Hogshed Creek
Surveyors Canyon
Tenmile Creek
Peterson Creek
Grub Creek
Cold Creek
Spring Creek
Steep Gulch
Streeter Creek
"Sand Rock Creek"
Lewis Creek
Big Rock Creek
Stapp Creek
Wilson Creek
Mud Springs Creek
Tuttle Creek
Little Case Creek
Mill Creek
Cahto Creek
Piggy Springs
Fox Creek
McKinley Creek
Elder Creek
Misery Creek
Jack of Hearts Creek
Dark Canyon
Deer Creek
Little Charlie Creek
Dutch Charlie Creek
Thompson Creek
Eagle Creek
Redwood Creek
North Fork Redwood Creek
Rock Creek
Muddy Gulch Creek
Kenny Creek
Haun Creek
Mud Creek
Grapevine Creek
Taylor Creek
Bear Creek
Little Rock Creek
Section Four Creek
Windem Creek
Middleton Creek

See also

List of South Fork Eel River crossings
Confusion Hill Bridges
List of Eel River crossings (California)
North Fork Eel River
Middle Fork Eel River
Van Duzen River
List of rivers of California

References

Works cited
Barrett, Samuel Alfred (1908). The ethno-geography of the Pomo and neighboring Indians. Harvard University: The University Press.
Durham, David L. (2001). Durham's Place Names of the California North Coast: Includes Del Norte, Humbolt, Lake, Mendocino & Trinity Counties. Quill Driver Books. .
Pike, Charlie (2001). Paddling Northern California. Globe Pequot. .

External links

California Coastal Watersheds
North Coast Region Watershed Map Note: South Fork Eel River is in dark red, near the center

Rivers of Mendocino County, California
Rivers of Humboldt County, California
Rivers of Northern California
Tributaries of the Eel River (California)
Wild and Scenic Rivers of the United States